BBHS may refer to:

Australia
Blacktown Boys High School, Sydney

Belize
Belmopan Baptist High School, Belmopan

Canada
Baron Byng High School, Montreal, Quebec

India
Baldwin Boys High School, Bangalore

Nigeria
Baptist Boys' High School, Abeokuta, Ogun State

Sweden
Borås på Bollebygd Högskola, Borås

United Kingdom
The Benjamin Britten High School, Lowestoft, Suffolk, England
Bell Baxter High School, Cupar, Fife, Scotland

United States
Benjamin Bosse High School, Evansville, Indiana
Bishop Blanchet High School, Seattle, Washington
Bishop Borgess High School, Redford, Michigan
Bishop Brady High School, Concord, New Hampshire
Bishop Brossart High School, Alexandria, Kentucky
Bishop Byrne High School (Memphis, Tennessee)
Bishop Byrne High School (Texas) - Port Arthur, Texas
Blind Brook High School, Rye Brook, New York